Naresh Yadav Ateli (born 1 February 1963) is an Indian politician and ex-member of the Legislative Assembly of Ateli constituency in Haryana state. He is the current president of Haryana Yuva Kisaan Sangharsh Samiti.

Background
Naresh Yadav was the President of Haryana Agricultural University aka "HAU" and General Secretary of the Haryana Pradesh Youth Congress.  He was elected as an Independent Candidate for the Haryana Legislative Assembly in 2005.

Personal life 
Naresh Yadav was born in 1963 in Rata Kalan Village in Ateli Nangal Tehsil of Mahendragarh District of Haryana State. He attained Master of Science (Agriculture) and LL.B in Alwar and Hisar city. After completing his studies, he married Omkala Yadav Singh. He has a son and a daughter.

Political career
In 2005, Naresh Yadav was a Member of the Legislative Assembly of Haryana.

He held the following offices:

 Member, A.I.C.C.
 President, Haryana Yuva Kisan Sangharsh Samiti.
 President, All India Federal Democratic Party.
 Member, I.F.U.N.A.

References

External links
 Naresh Yadav has threatened the state government of launching an agitation
 Naresh Yadav plans stir against govt
 Naresh Yadav ATELI (MAHENDRAGARH)
 Haryana Vidhan Sabha MLA
 Ateli (Haryana) Assembly Constituency Elections
 Naresh Yadav on Friday has demanded protection
 Naresh Yadav ATELI (MAHENDRAGARH)
 Haryana Vidhan Sabha MLA
 Ateli (Haryana) Assembly Constituency Elections

Living people
1963 births
Indian National Congress politicians from Haryana